The 1978 British National Track Championships were a series of track cycling competitions held from 24–29 July 1978, at the Leicester Velodrome.

It was billed as the centenary championships based on the first ever winner Ian Falconer who won the 1878 two miles national championship. A new hardwood track costing £175,000 was laid down just one week before competition began.

Medal summary

Men's Events

Women's Events

References

1978 in British sport
July 1978 sports events in the United Kingdom